The Imperial Japanese Armed Forces (IJAF) were the combined military forces of the Japanese Empire. Formed during the Meiji Restoration in 1868, they were disbanded in 1947, shortly after Japan's defeat to the Allies of World War II; the renewed Constitution of Japan, drafted during the Allied occupation of Japan, replaced the IJAF with the present-day Japan Self-Defense Forces.

The Imperial Japanese Army and the Imperial Japanese Navy functioned as the IJAF's primary service branches, with the country's aerial power being split between the Army Air Service under the former and the Navy Air Service under the latter.

History

The IJAF was founded with an edict emanated on 3 January 1868, as part of the Japanese reorganization of the army and the application of innovations during the Meiji Restoration. The reorganization of the army and the navy during the Meiji period boosted Japanese military strength, allowing the Imperial Japanese Army and the Imperial Japanese Navy to achieve major victories, such as during the First Sino-Japanese war and the Russo-Japanese War.

The IJAF also served in WW1 and WW2. It was operational until the Surrender of Japan after World War II in 1947.

Organization

During the pre-war era the army and navy had separate school branches. Since the Meiji era, the Choshu Domain from Yamaguchi Prefecture dominated the IJA. The IJN was dominated by the Satsuma Domain from Kagoshima Prefecture. This resulted in that they operated separately rather than a single umbrella strategy.

During the Showa period, the IJA and IJN had different outlooks on allies and enemies. The IJA considered Nazi Germany as a natural partner and the Soviet Union as a threat, while the IJN stressed that collaboration with Nazi Germany would hurt relations with the United Kingdom and the United States.

Some equipment was also procured separately.  For example the IJA secured its own ships and self-designed submarines in World War 2.  Former Prime Minister Shigeru Yoshida criticized the sectionalism of the IJAF.

Interservice rivalry

The Imperial Army and Navy had a fierce interservice rivalry centering around how the Imperial Japanese Armed Forces ought to secure territories containing valuable natural resources not available at home to fuel and grow the Japanese economy. The Army mainly supported the Hokushin-ron doctrine, which called for expansion into Manchuria and Siberia and would have the army take on a prime role, while the Navy supported the Nanshin-ron doctrine, which stated that Japan ought to expand into Southeast Asia and the Pacific Islands and would be reliant on the navy to do so.

Main chronology

Under Emperor Meiji
1870 (1870) Proclamation of unified military system (Army is French-style, Navy is British-style)
1871 (1871) Goshinpei are organized by donations from Satsuma, Choshu, and Tosa.
Proclamation of conscription order in 1873
1874 Saga Rebellion, Taiwan troop dispatch
Ganghwa Island Incident in 1875
1876 Kumamoto Shinfuren Rebellion, Akizuki Rebellion, Hagi Rebellion
Meiji 10 (1877) Satsuma Rebellion
1882 (1882) Promulgation of the Imperial Rescript to Soldiers
1888 (1888) Promulgation of the Army General Staff Ordinance, the Navy General Staff Ordinance, and the Division Headquarters Ordinance
1889 (Meiji 22) Promulgation of the Constitution of the Empire of Japan
1893 (Meiji 26) Promulgation of the Wartime Imperial Headquarters Ordinance
Meiji 27 (1894) Sino-Japanese War
The Sino-Japanese War ended in 1895. Japanese troops requisition Taiwan based on the Treaty of Shimonoseki
1899 (Meiji 32) Boxer Rebellion Incident
1900 (Meiji 33) Established an active military officer system of the military minister, Kitasei incident
Meiji 37 (1904) Russo-Japanese War
1905 (Meiji 38) Operation Sakhalin, the end of the Russo-Japanese War

Under Emperor Taishō 
In 1913, the military minister can be appointed as a reserve, back-up, or retired general.
1914 Siemens scandal, World War I (Battle of Qingdao)
1918 Siberian intervention, end of World War I
1919 (Taisho 8) Promulgation of the Kwantung Army Headquarters Ordinance
Nikolayevsk Incident in 1920
1921 Washington Naval Treaty
The Amakasu Incident in 1923
Siberian intervention ended in 1925, Ugaki military contraction

Under Emperor Shōwa
Shōwa 2 (1927)
First Shandong troops
First Nanking Incident
Shōwa 3 (1928)
Second Shandong troops
Jinan Incident
Zhang Zuolin bombing case
Shōwa 5 (1930)
London Naval Treaty
Taiwan Musha Incident
Shōwa 6 (1931)
March Incident
Manchurian Incident
October Incident
Shōwa 7 (1932)
January 28th Incident
May 15 Incident
Manchuria founded
Shōwa 9 (1934)
Washington Naval Treaty abolished
Shōwa 11 (1936)
February 26 Incident
Resurrection of the military minister's active military service system
Japan-Germany Anti-Comintern Pact
Shōwa 12 (1937)
China Incident (Sino-Japanese War)
Marco Polo Bridge Incident
Tongzhou case
Battle of Beiping-Tianjin
Battle of Shanghai
Rape of Nanking
Shōwa 13 (1938)
Battle of Wuhan
Battle of Lake Khasan
Promulgation of the National Mobilization Law
Shōwa 14 (1939)
The Battle of Khalkhin Gol
Shōwa 15 (1940)
Annexation of French Indochina
Shōwa 16 (1941)
Declaration of war against the United States and United Kingdom, Greater East Asia War (Pacific War), Southern Operation (Invasion of Hong Kong, Malayan Campaign, Pearl Harbor attack, etc.)
Sinking of HMS Prince of Wales and HMS Repulse
Shōwa 17 (1942)
Battle of Rabaul (start of New Guinea Campaign)
Fall of Singapore
Bombing of Darwin
Dutch East Indies Campaign
Battle of Yunnan-Burma Road
Battle of Ceylon
Battle of Midway
Kokoda Track Campaign
Shōwa 18 (1943)
Battle of Guadalcanal Island
Navy Instep Incident
Battle of Attu
Shōwa 19 (1944)
Navy B case
Operation C (U Go Offensive)
Operation Ichi-Go
Battle of Mariana and Palau Islands
Philippines Defense Battle
Creation of a special attack corps
Shōwa 20 (1945)
February Yalta Conference
Rape of Manila
Battle of Iwo Jima
March Tokyo air raid
Battle of Okinawa
Participation in the Soviet Union against Japan (Soviet invasion of Manchuria / Battle of Sakhalin / Battle of Shumshu)
Accepting the Potsdam Declaration
Soviet troops occupy the South Karafuto and Kuril Islands
September 2-Japanese Instrument of Surrender Signing Ceremony on Battleship Missouri (Japanese Instrument of Surrender, All Armies Stopped Combat, Disarmament Order), Greater East Asia War (Pacific War) and End of World War II
Soviet Union occupies the Northern Territories
November The Ministry of the Army and the Ministry of the Navy are dismantled and become the 1st Ministry of Demobilization and the 2nd Ministry of Demobilization.
Shōwa 21 (1946)
May International Military Tribunal for the Far East opens
November 3-Promulgation of the Constitution of Japan
Shōwa 22 (1947)
May 3-Enforcement of the Constitution of Japan
Shōwa 25 (1950)
August 10-Establishment of National Police Reserve
Shōwa 27 (1952)
August 10-National Safety Forces reorganization
Shōwa 29 (1954)
July 1-Established "Self-Defense Forces (land, sea, aviation)" and established the Defense Agency (shifted to "Ministry of Defense" on January 9, 2007)

References

Military of the Empire of Japan